The Italian Roman Catholic Diocese of Trieste in the Triveneto, has existed since no later than 524, and in its current form since 1977. The bishop's seat is in Trieste Cathedral. It is a suffragan of the Archdiocese of Gorizia.

History
Frugifer, consecrated in 524, was the first bishop of Trieste; the diocese was then a suffragan of the archdiocese of Aquileia.

Among the bishops were:
Enea Silvio de' Piccolomini, later Pope Pius II;
Pietro Bonomo, a secretary of Emperor Frederick III and Emperor Maximilian I, bishop in 1502, and known as pater concilii in the Fifth Lateran Council (1512);
Giovanni Bogarino, teacher of Archduke Charles of Styria, bishop from 1591.

From 1787 a series of administrative changes took place, beginning with the suppression of the diocese of Pedena, which was added to that of Trieste. Emperor Joseph II then abolished the diocese of Trieste and  Archdiocese of Gorizia in 1788, merging them into the new diocese of Gradisca. In 1791 Joseph's brother, Emperor Leopold II, divided the diocese of Gradisca into the newly created diocese of Gorizia-Gradisca, or Görz-Gradisca, and a re-created diocese of Trieste, appointing as its bishop the tutor of his children Sigismund Anton, Count of Hohenwart. Later attempts were made to suppress the see again, but the emperor decreed its preservation, appointing Ignatius Cajetanus von Buset zu Faistenberg bishop. After his death in 1803 the see remained vacant for eighteen years, because of the disorders caused by Napoleon.

Emperor Franz II finally appointed Antonio Leonardis da Lucinico as the new bishop of Trieste in 1821. In 1828 the Slovenian diocese of Koper, or Capodistria-Koper, was united with Trieste, after which it was known as the Diocese of Trieste-Koper (Capodistria), or Triest-Capo d'Istria (in the German spelling).

Bishop Bartholomew Legat was present at the Synod of Vienna in 1849, where he defended the views of the minority in the First Vatican Council. In 1909 Bishop Franz Xaver Nagl was appointed coadjutor cum jure successionis to the ninety-year-old Cardinal Prince-Archbishop Anton Gruscha of Vienna.

In 1977 Koper / Capodistria became an independent diocese once more, leaving the diocese of Trieste in its present state.

Bishops

Ordinaries

Diocese of Trieste
Erected: 6th Century 
Latin Name: Tergestinus
Metropolitan: Archdiocese of Gorizia

Guillaume de Villeneuve (Franchi), O.F.M. (1327–1330 Died)

Giacomo Balardi Arrigoni, O.P. (10 Jan 1418 – 11 Dec 1424 Appointed, Bishop of Urbino)
...
Enea Silvio Piccolomini (17 Apr 1447 – 23 Sep 1450 Confirmed, Bishop of Siena) 
...
Pietro Bonomo (5 Apr 1502 – 4 Jul 1546 Died) 
Antonio Paragües Castillejo, O.S.B. (21 Aug 1549 – 4 Nov 1558 Appointed, Archbishop of Cagliari) 
Giovanni Betta, O.S.B. (3 Apr 1560 – 15 Apr 1565 Died) 
Andrea Rapicio (22 Aug 1567 – 31 Dec 1573 Died) 
Giacinto Frangipane (1 Mar 1574 – 8 Nov 1574 Died) 
Nicolò Coret (28 Feb 1575 – 10 Jul 1590 Died) 
Giovanni Wagenring (Bogarino) (22 May 1592 – 1597 Died) 
Ursino de Bertiis (7 Aug 1598 – 1 Sep 1620 Died) 
Rinaldo Scarlicchio (5 Jul 1621 – 13 Nov 1630 Appointed, Bishop of Ljubljana) 
Pompeo Coronini (27 Jan 1631 – 14 Mar 1646 Died)
Antonio Marenzi (10 Sep 1646 – 22 Oct 1662 Died)
Franz Maximilian Vaccano (12 Mar 1663 – 15 Aug 1672 Died) 
Giacomo Ferdinando de Gorizzutti (30 Jan 1673 – 20 Sep 1691 Died) 
Giovanni Francesco Miller (6 Oct 1692 – 23 Apr 1720 Died) 
Joseph Anton von Delmestri von Schönberg (23 Apr 1720 – 19 Feb 1721 Died) 
Lucas Sartorius Delmestri von Schönberg (26 Jun 1724 – 6 Nov 1739 Died) 
Leopold Josef Hannibal Petazzi de Castel Nuovo (30 Sep 1740 – 15 Dec 1760 Confirmed, Bishop of Ljubljana) 
Antonius von Herberstein, C.R. (6 Apr 1761 – 2 Dec 1774 Died) 
Franz Philipp von Inzaghi (24 Apr 1775 – 15 Dec 1788 Confirmed, Bishop of Gradisca) 
Sigismund Anton von Hohenwart, S.J. (26 Sep 1791 – 12 Sep 1794 Confirmed, Bishop of Sankt Pölten) 
Ignatius Cajetanus von Buset zu Faistenberg (27 Jun 1796 – 19 Sep 1803 Died) 
Antonio Leonardis da Lucinico (13 Aug 1821 – 14 Jan 1830 Died)

Diocese of Trieste e Capodistria
United: 30 June 1828 with the Diocese of Capodistria and territory added from the suppressed Diocese of Novigrad
Latin Name: Tergestinus et Iustinopolitanus
Metropolitan: Archdiocese of Gorizia 

Matteo Raunicher (30 Sep 1831 – 20 Nov 1845 Died) 
Bartolomeo Legat (21 Dec 1846 – 12 Feb 1875 Died) 
Juraj Dobrila (5 Jul 1875 – 13 Jan 1882 Died) 
Giovanni Nepomuceno Glavina (3 Jul 1882 – 1895 Resigned) 
Andrija Marija Sterk (25 Jun 1896 – 17 Sep 1901 Died) 
Franz Xaver Nagl (9 Jun 1902 – 19 Jan 1910 Confirmed, Coadjutor Archbishop of Vienna); future Cardinal
Andrea Karlin (6 Feb 1911 – 15 Dec 1919 Resigned) 
Angelo Bartolomasi (15 Dec 1919 – 11 Dec 1922 Appointed, Bishop of Pinerolo) 
Luigi Fogar (9 Jul 1923 – 30 Oct 1936 Resigned) 
Antonio Santin (16 May 1938 – 28 Jun 1975 Retired); Archbishop (personal title) in 1963

Diocese of Trieste17 October 1977: Split into the Diocese of Koper and the Diocese of Trieste''  

Lorenzo Bellomi (17 Oct 1977 – 23 Aug 1996 Died) 
Eugenio Ravignani (4 Jan 1997 – 4 Jul 2009 Retired) 
Giampaolo Crepaldi (4 Jul 2009 – ), Archbishop (personal title)

Coadjutor Bishops
Giuseppe Antonio von Delmestri von Schönberg (1718-1720)
Wilhelm von Leslie (1711-1716), did not succeed to see; appointed Bishop of Vác, Hungary

Other priests of this diocese who became bishops
Aldrago Antonio de Piccardi, appointed Bishop of Pedena, Austria in 1766
Guido Pozzo, appointed Almoner of the Office of Papal Charities and titular archbishop in 2012
Franz von Raigesfeld, appointed auxiliary bishop of Ljubljana, (now in) Slovenia in 1795
Eugenio Ravignani, appointed Bishop of Vittorio Veneto in 1983; later returned here as Bishop

Notes

Trieste
Trieste
Culture in Trieste